Dis-moi oui...  is a 1995 French comedy film directed by Alexandre Arcady.

Cast 
 Jean-Hugues Anglade - Stéphane Villiers
  - Eva Castillo
 Nadia Farès - Florence
 Claude Rich - Professor Villiers
 Valérie Kaprisky - Nathalie
 Patrick Braoudé - Brice
 Jean-François Stévenin - Dr. Arnaud
 Anouk Aimée - Claire Charvet

References

External links 
 

French comedy films
1990s French films